The 2019 NCAA Division I Cross Country Championships was the 81st annual NCAA Men's Division I Cross Country Championship and the 39th annual NCAA Women's Division I Cross Country Championship to determine the team and individual national champions of NCAA Division I men's and women's collegiate cross country running in the United States. In all, four different titles were contested: men's and women's individual and team championships.

Women's title
Distance: 6,000 meters
(DC) = Defending champions

Women's Team Result (Top 10)

Women's Individual Result (Top 10)

Men's title
Distance: 10,000 meters

Men's Team Result (Top 10)

Men's Individual Result (Top 10)

See also
 NCAA Men's Division II Cross Country Championship 
 NCAA Women's Division II Cross Country Championship 
 NCAA Men's Division III Cross Country Championship 
 NCAA Women's Division III Cross Country Championship

References

NCAA Cross Country Championships
NCAA Division I Cross Country Championships
NCAA Division I Cross Country Championships
Terre Haute, Indiana
Track and field in Indiana
NCAA Division I Cross Country Championships